H.P. Lovecraft’s Cthulhu: The Whisperer in Darkness was a three-part comic book mini-series published in the USA by Millennium Publications. It followed a group of investigators, the Miskatonic Project, as they confronted the Mi-go, the cunning Fungi from Yuggoth.

Parts of the series

Created by Mark Ellis, The Miskatonic Project consisted of three paranormal investigators who apparently had experienced brushes with the Great Old Ones in the past. Lord Justin Sabbath, Professor Augustus Grant, and psychic Fleur Avignon used the Miskatonic University as a base of operations. They worked closely with noted folklorist Professor Albert N. Wilmarth, who brought the Mi-Go to their attention.

Set in 1929, the first issue introduced the members of the Miskatonic Project in a framing sequence penciled by Darryl Banks and written by Mark Ellis. The rest of the issue was filled out by writer Terry Collins' adaptation of H.P. Lovecraft’s story "The Whisperer in Darkness", with art by noted Lovecraft illustrator Daryl Hutchison and Melissa Martin.

The following two issues presented a sequel to the events of "The Whisperer In Darkness", penciled by veteran Marvel Comics artist Don Heck, with a script provided by Mark Ellis and Terry Collins. The Mi-Go and their human collaborators were portrayed as paving the way for the return of the Old Ones, including Cthulhu. Inspector John Raymond Legrasse, the New Orleans police officer who first appeared in Lovecraft's inaugural Cthulhu story, "The Call of Cthulhu", appears in the second chapter.

The three issues were collected together as a single graphic novel published by Millennium Publications in 1993. An updated edition featuring new artwork and retitled The Miskatonic Project: H.P. Lovecraft's The Whisperer in Darkness was released by Transfuzion/Millennial Concepts in October 2008.

Trading cards 
The three issues also included "Old Ones" trading cards, rendered by Darryl Banks, Daryl Hutchison, Deirdre DeLay, and Joe Phillips:
 Part One (Dec. 1991) — "Cthulhu" and "Cthulhu Statue" trading cards
 Part Two (Feb. 1992) — "Hastur" and "Mi-Go" trading cards
 Part Three (Apr. 1992) — "Yig, Father of Serpents" and "Quachil Uttaus" trading cards

See also 
H.P. Lovecraft
Cthulhu

External links 
 Official site of Mark Ellis
 Comicspace.com Select comics work by Mark Ellis
Press release announcing Millennial Concepts & Transfuzion's Miskatonic Project graphic novel

Cthulhu Mythos comics
American comics titles
Horror comics
1991 comics debuts
1992 comics endings